Reinhold Aman (April 8, 1936 – March 2, 2019) was a chemical engineer and professor of German before achieving national and even international recognition as the publisher of Maledicta, a scholarly journal dedicated to the study of offensive language, also known as maledictology.

Career
Aman was born in Fürstenzell near Passau, Bavaria.  He studied chemical engineering in Augsburg and later worked as a chemical analyst and petroleum chemist in Frankfurt, Munich, and Montreal prior to working as a translator and clerk for the U.S. Army in Frankfurt. He moved to Milwaukee in 1959, initially working there as a metallurgist and analytical chemist. 

Aman earned a bachelor's degree at the University of Wisconsin–Milwaukee in 1965, and he completed a Ph.D. in German at the University of Texas in 1968 with a dissertation on "Der Kampf in Wolframs Parzival" ("Combat in  Wolfram's Parzival"). During his university years he taught German, French, Spanish, and English at various high schools, usually on a part-time basis. In his final year at Texas, he also served as a teaching assistant and teaching associate.

Aman was hired in 1968 as an assistant professor of German at the University of Wisconsin–Milwaukee (which he later dismissed as "Dungheap U"), where he taught undergraduate and graduate level courses in German philology, grammar, stylistics, conversation, phonetics, medieval and Baroque literature, dialectology, bibliography, and research methods. Denied promotion to tenure in 1974, he held that he had been terminated out of "pure professional jealousy". He subsequently began publishing Maledicta from his home.

Apart from Maledicta, Aman published a Bayrisch-Österreichisches Schimpfwörterbuch ("Bavarian-Austrian Curse Dictionary") and shorter monographs as well as various books, including Hillary Clinton's Pen Pal: A Guide to Life and Lingo in Federal Prisons  (1996). At the time, Clinton was experiencing legal difficulties, and Aman claimed he wanted to make use of his recent term in federal prison (see below) to inform her about prison customs and argot so that she could avoid potentially lethal faux pas.

Prison term
In 1993, following a bitter divorce, Aman was sentenced to 27 months in federal prison for  mailing a 2-page pamphlet entitled "Legal Slimebags of Wisconsin" to numerous Wisconsin lawyers and judges as well as threatening postcards to his ex-wife. The postcards included pasted-on headlines of news articles about women killed by their former husbands. He served 15.5 months at Santa Rita, Terminal Island, Lompoc, and Dublin (now a Federal prison for women only), and was released in February 1995.

References

Further reading

External links 

 (Archived at HighBeam; subscription required)

German emigrants to the United States
German chemical engineers
20th-century German chemists
1936 births
2019 deaths
University of Texas at Austin alumni
University of Wisconsin–Milwaukee alumni
University of Wisconsin–Milwaukee faculty
Professors of German in the United States
People from Passau (district)
Engineers from Baden-Württemberg